The real (plural: réis) was the currency of Portuguese Mozambique until 1914. It was equivalent to and circulated alongside the Portuguese real.

History
Coins specific for Mozambique were issued until 1853, whilst the first banknotes appeared in 1877. The real was replaced by the escudo at a rate of 1 escudo = 1000 réis.

Coins
Copper coins were issued specifically for Mozambique in denominations of 1, 2, 20, 40 and 80 réis. Between 1835 and 1851, crude, rectangular coins were issued. There were silver onca, worth 2880 réis, and gold 1¼ and 2½ meticais. Various foreign coins were countermarked in 1889 for use in Mozambique.

Banknotes
The Banco Nacional Ultramarino issued notes for 5000 and 20,000 réis in 1877. Additional denominations of 1000, 2000, 2500 and 10,000 réis were issued in 1878, followed by 50,000 réis in 1897. In 1909, notes were also issued denominated in libra esterlina (pound sterling).

Modern obsolete currencies
Currencies of Portugal
Economic history of Portugal
1914 disestablishments in Portuguese Mozambique
History of Mozambique
Portuguese Mozambique
Currencies of Mozambique